General Richard Airey, 1st Baron Airey,  (April 180314 September 1881), known as Sir Richard Airey between 1855 and 1876, was a senior British Army officer of the 19th century.

Background
Born at Newcastle upon Tyne, Northumberland, Airey was the eldest son of Lieutenant General Sir George Airey and his wife Catherine Talbot, daughter of Richard Talbot and Margaret Talbot, 1st Baroness Talbot of Malahide.

Military career
Airey was educated at the Royal Military College, Sandhurst, and entered the army as an ensign of the 34th (Cumberland) Regiment of Foot in 1821. He became captain in 1825, and served as aide-de-camp on the staff of Sir Frederick Adam in the Ionian Islands (1827–1830) and on that of Lord Aylmer in North America (1830–1832). In 1838 Airey, then a lieutenant colonel, went to Horse Guards as assistant adjutant-general. In 1847, he was appointed assistant quartermaster-general, an appointment he retained until 1851. From 1852 to 1854 he was Military Secretary to the commander-in-chief, Lord Hardinge.

In 1854 he was given a brigade command in the army sent out to the East, from which, however, he was rapidly transferred to the onerous and difficult post of Quartermaster-General under Lord Raglan, in which capacity he served through the campaign in the Crimean War. He was reported upon most favourably by his superiors, Lord Raglan and Sir James Simpson and for his performance was made a major general in December 1854 and was awarded a Knight Commander of the Order of the Bath (KCB). Following Raglan's instructions, Airey issued the fateful order for the Charge of the Light Brigade. He was also criticised for incompetence in the provision of supplies and transport. Airey demanded an enquiry on his return to England, which took place under Lord Seaton and which cleared him completely, but he never recovered from the effects of persecution from his critics.

In 1855 he returned to London to become Quartermaster-General to the Forces at home. In 1862 he was promoted to lieutenant general, and from 1865 to 1870 he was Governor of Gibraltar, being appointed a Knight Grand Cross of the Order of the Bath (GCB) in 1867. In 1870 he became Adjutant-General to the Forces at Headquarters, and in the following year attained the full rank of general. On 29 November 1876, on his retirement, he was elevated to the Peerage of the United Kingdom as Baron Airey, of Killingworth in the County of Northumberland. During 1879–1880 he presided over the celebrated Airey Commission on army reform.

Family
In 1838, he married his cousin, Harriet Mary Everard Talbot (d. 28 July 1881), daughter of James Talbot, 3rd Baron Talbot of Malahide. Their only daughter, Katherine Margaret Airey (d. 22 May 1896), married Sir Geers Cotterell, 3rd Baronet. Airey died at the house of Lord Wolseley, at Leatherhead, Surrey, when his title became extinct.

Notes

References

thePeerage.com

 

|-

|-
 

|-

 

1803 births
1881 deaths
Barons in the Peerage of the United Kingdom
British Army generals
British Army personnel of the Crimean War
Governors of Gibraltar
Knights Grand Cross of the Order of the Bath
Royal Horse Guards officers
Commanders of the Military Order of Savoy
Military personnel from Newcastle upon Tyne
34th Regiment of Foot officers
Commandeurs of the Légion d'honneur
Peers of the United Kingdom created by Queen Victoria